Kalyanasundaram Higher Secondary School (KHSS in short) is a co-educational higher secondary school in Thanjavur City. Established in 1891, it is one of the oldest schools. It is named in honor of Shri.K.Kalyanasundaramier who donated land for building this school in 1891.

References 

High schools and secondary schools in Tamil Nadu
Education in Thanjavur
1891 establishments in India
Educational institutions established in 1891